The Norwegian National Service Medal is awarded upon completion of mandatory military service (usually one year, six months for the Home Guard).
The medal exists in four versions, one for each branch of service (army, air force, navy and home guard).

The front of the medal shows the crest of the service branch, and the reverse has the name of the branch and the armed forces motto "for fred og frihet" (bm) or "for fred og fridom"(nn) ("for peace and freedom").

See also
Norwegian orders and medals

References

Military awards and decorations of Norway